Donald G. Miller (born c. 1933) is a retired American football coach and former player. He served as the head football coach at Trinity College in Hartford, Connecticut from 1967 to 1998. Miller played college football at the University of Delaware, where he was the starting quarterback who led the Blue Hens to victory in the 1954 Refrigerator Bowl.

Miller began his coaching career at Newark High School in Newark, Delaware in 1955. He led Newark to a record of 31–2 in four seasons as head coach before he resigned in April 1959 to take an assistant coaching position at Amherst College in Amherst, Massachusetts.

Jessee/Miller Field, the home stadium of the Trinity Bantams football team is named for Miller and his predecessor, Dan Jessee.

References

Year of birth missing (living people)
1930s births
Living people
American football quarterbacks
Amherst Mammoths football coaches
Delaware Fightin' Blue Hens football players
Trinity Bantams football coaches
College softball coaches in the United States
High school football coaches in Delaware